Oxynoemacheilus pindus is a species of Cypriniformes fish in the stone loach family (Nemacheilidae).

It is found in Greece and Albania. Its natural habitat is rivers.
It is threatened by habitat loss and change caused by water extraction, pollution, and agriculture.

References 

pindus
Fauna of Albania
Fauna of Greece
Freshwater fish of Europe
Taxa named by Panos Stavros Economidis
Fish described in 2005
Taxonomy articles created by Polbot